Churchend is a hamlet in Gloucestershire, England,  west of Stroud. It is part of the civil parish of Eastington.

The church of St Michael and All Angels dates from the 14th century and is a grade II* listed building.

References

External links

Hamlets in Gloucestershire
Stroud District